Keyhan Hashemnia is an Iranian politician who served as the governor of Gilan Province. He was previously Deputy Governor of Gilan for planning from May 2008 until June 2011.

Affiliation 
Hashemnia has relations with Society of Devotees of the Islamic Revolution and Mahmoud Ahmadinejad.

References

1960 births
Living people
People from Astara, Iran
Iranian governors
Islamic Revolutionary Guard Corps personnel of the Iran–Iraq War
University of Tehran alumni
Iranian sociologists
Faculty of Theology and Islamic Studies of the University of Tehran alumni